The women's kumite 53 kilograms competition at the 2006 Asian Games in Doha, Qatar was held on 12 December 2006 at the Qatar SC Indoor Hall.

A total of fourteen competitors from fourteen different countries competed in this event, limited to fighters whose body weight was less than 53 kilograms.

Schedule
All times are Arabia Standard Time (UTC+03:00)

Results

Main bracket

Repechage

References
Results

External links
Official website

Women's kumite 53 kg